Radburn is a New Jersey Transit train station in the Dutch Colonial Revival style, served by the Bergen County Line. It is on Fair Lawn Avenue in the Radburn section of Fair Lawn, in Bergen County, New Jersey, United States. It is one of two New Jersey Transit train stations in Fair Lawn, the other being Broadway.

The station was designed and built in 1929 by Clarence Stein, as part of the Radburn development. It has been listed in the state and federal Registers of Historic Places since 1984 and is part of the Operating Passenger Railroad Stations Thematic Resource.

History 

The location of the Radburn development was considered beneficial because of its location on the Erie Railroad with connections to Jersey City, Newark and Manhattan. The designers of the development saw the benefit of a suburban railroad station for planning throughout the New York Metropolitan Area. In July 1928, they proposed the Fairlawn Station Square with a depot that cost $60,000 (1928 USD) and would serve those who would be in the neighborhood after construction of the first 200 homers. The new depot would serve Suffern to the north and Hoboken to the southeast along with connections in the area.

A new railroad depot was constructed on the Bergen County Railroad in 1929. The depot replaced a wooden freight depot that served the area. This new station was designed by Clarence Stein in a Dutch Colonial Revival to keep the idea of modern and efficient and in a similar style of the Radburn neighborhood. The new Radburn station had three sections: a central area that contained the  waiting room and ticket office. This new pavilion contained a sloping and overhanging roof. This south wing of the depot contained the restrooms, and the north wing contained the office of the track supervisor, the baggage room and a porch for customers. The depot had a sandstone design with  vaulted ceilings with a slate roof and clapboarding siding.

Station layout
The station has two tracks, each with a low-level side platform. It is staffed with a station agent on weekday mornings.

See also 
 List of New Jersey Transit stations
 National Register of Historic Places listings in Bergen County, New Jersey

Bibliography

References

External links

 Station from Fair Lawn Avenue from Google Maps Street View

Fair Lawn, New Jersey
Railway stations in Bergen County, New Jersey
NJ Transit Rail Operations stations
Railway stations on the National Register of Historic Places in New Jersey
Former Erie Railroad stations
Dutch Colonial Revival architecture in the United States
National Register of Historic Places in Bergen County, New Jersey
New Jersey Register of Historic Places
Railway stations opened in 1881
1881 establishments in New Jersey